Mubariz Gahraman oghlu Gurbanli, Chairman to the State Committee on Religious Associations of the Republic of Azerbaijan.

Biography 
Mubariz Gurbanli was born in Koltehneli, Shamkir village, district of Shamkir, 7 January 1954.

Graduated with honors from History Department of the Baku State University; Phd in History; associate professor; author of tens of books and articles.

Foreign languages: Russian, English.
  
In 1978 secondary school teacher at Koltehneli, Shamkir village of Shemkir district.

In 1985, he was lecturer, senior lecturer, associate professor, Head of chair, and vice-rector at the Azerbaijan State Culture and Fine Arts University; currently is an associate professor of the university.
 
In 1995-2010, Was elected to four Milli Mejlis terms of the Republic of Azerbaijan. Member of the Standing Commission of the Milli Mejlis on Legal Policy and State Building Affairs; Head of the working group on interparliamentary relations between Azerbaijan-Bosnia and Herzogovina; member of the working groups on interparliamentary relations between Azerbaijan-Canada, and Azerbaijan-Kuwait.

In 1996-2014, Member of the delegation of Azerbaijan to the parliamentary Assembly of the Black Sea Economic Cooperation Organization, and Deputy Committee chairperson. Member of the Political Council of New Azerbaijan Party and Deputy Executive Secretary of the New Azerbaijan Party.

In 2014, he was awarded with the Order of Glory for active participation in the public and political life of the Republic of Azerbaijan by the Decree dated 7 January 2014 of the President of the Republic of Azerbaijan.

He was appointed Chairman to the State Committee on Religious Associations of the Republic of Azerbaijan by the Decree dated 21 July 2014 of the President of the Republic of Azerbaijan.

Since 27 December 2018, he has been Chairman of the Board of Trustees of the Azerbaijan Institute of Theology.

At the 7th Congress of the New Azerbaijan Party (5 March 2021), he was elected a member of the YAP Board.

Married, with two children.

Awards 
Shohrat Order (Azerbaijan)

See also
Cabinet of Azerbaijan

References

External links
Mübariz Qurbanlı. adam.az

1954 births
Living people
People from Shamkir
Government ministers of Azerbaijan
Baku State University alumni